Adipiodone (INN, or iodipamide; trade names Cholografin and Biligrafin) is a pharmaceutical drug used as a radiocontrast agent in X-ray imaging. It was introduced in the 1950s.

References 

Radiocontrast agents
Iodoarenes
Benzoic acids
Anilides